Denton Gavin Guy-Williams (born 8 May 1972) is a Sierra Leonean sprinter. He competed in the men's 4 × 100 metres relay at the 1992 Summer Olympics.

References

External links
 

1972 births
Living people
Athletes (track and field) at the 1992 Summer Olympics
Sierra Leonean male sprinters
Olympic athletes of Sierra Leone
Sierra Leone Creole people
Commonwealth Games competitors for Sierra Leone
Athletes (track and field) at the 1994 Commonwealth Games
Place of birth missing (living people)